Guillermo Torres (21 September 1909 – 1985) was a Chilean footballer. He played in nine matches for the Chile national football team from 1937 to 1942. He was also part of Chile's squad for the 1937 South American Championship.

References

External links
 

1909 births
1985 deaths
Chilean footballers
Chile international footballers
Association football forwards
Magallanes footballers
Santiago Wanderers footballers
Santiago Morning footballers